Weobley High School is a mixed secondary school located in Weobley in the English county of Herefordshire.

It is a community school administered by Herefordshire Council, and mainly admits pupils from Canon Pyon, Credenhill, Dilwyn, Staunton on Wye and Weobley. It is a small rural school.

The school offers GCSEs and BTECs as programmes of study for pupils.

History

The school was established in 1963 as Weobley County Secondary School. In 1970 the school had 251 pupils.

School performance and inspection judgements

 2004: Inspection by Ofsted judged that the school was Inadequate and that Special Measures were necessary to improve it.
 2005: Inspection judged the school Satisfactory.
 2008: Inspection again judged the school Satisfactory.
 2011: The school was judged Outstanding.
 2013: The school was judged Good.
 2017: The school was again judged Good.

As of 2021, the most recent inspection was in 2017.

References

External links
Weobley High School official website

Secondary schools in Herefordshire
Community schools in Herefordshire